Alice Jones is an American poet, physician, and psychoanalyst. Her most recent collection of poetry is Plunge (Apogee Press, 2012). Her poems have appeared in literary journals and magazines including Antioch Review, Ploughshares, Poetry, The Boston Review, The Denver Quarterly, and Chelsea. Her honors include fellowships from the Bread Loaf Writers Conference and the National Endowment for the Arts.

She is a training and supervising analyst on the faculty of the San Francisco Center for Psychoanalysis, and practices in Berkeley, California. She is also co-editor of Apogee Press.

Awards
 2013, "Plunge" was a finalist for the Northern California Book Award in Poetry
 2009, First Annual Narrative Magazine Poetry Award
 2006, Lyric Poetry Award (Poetry Society of America)
 2001, Robert H. Winner Award (Poetry Society of America)
 1999, Jane Kenyon Chapbook Award
 1992, Beatrice Hawley Award
 1994, NEA fellowship in poetry.

Published works

Full-length poetry collections

 
 
 
 Extreme Directions (Omnidawn, 2002)
 The Knot (Alice James Books, 1992)

Chapbooks
 Anatomy (Bullnettle Press, 1992)

References

External links
 Official website
 Alice James Books > Author Page > Alice Jones
 Omnidawn > Author Page > Alice Jones
 Gorgeous Mourning, Apogee Press
 Poem: Poetry Society of America > 96th Annual Award Winning Poems > Lyric Poetry Award > Alice Jones > Valle d'Aosta
 Audio: The Cortland Review > August 1999, Issue 8 > Nightfall and Paperweight by Alice Jones
 Gorgeous Mourning Review
 Spell, Narrative Magazine

Year of birth missing (living people)
Living people
Poets from California
National Endowment for the Arts Fellows
American psychoanalysts
American women poets
21st-century American women